Nino Haratischwili (born 8 June 1983) is a Georgia born German novelist, playwright, and theater director. She has received numerous awards, including the Adelbert von Chamisso Prize, the Kranichsteiner Literaturpreis, and the Literaturpreis des Kulturkreises der deutschen Wirtschaft.

Haratischwili was born and raised in Tbilisi, Georgia, where she attended a German-language school. To escape the political and social chaos that followed the collapse of the Soviet Union, she moved to Germany for two years in the early 1990s with her mother, where she attended seventh and eighth grades of school. Her family returned to Georgia afterwards. Haratischwili later moved to Germany again to attend drama school in Hamburg. After working as a theater director in Hamburg for several years, she published her first book, Juja, in 2010. She became a German citizen in 2012.

Haratischwili currently lives in Hamburg.

Bibliography

 Der Cousin und Bekina (The Cousin and Bekina), Katzengraben-Presse, 2001, .
 Georgia / Liv Stein. Zwei Stücke (Georgia / Liv Stein / Two Plays), Verlag der Autoren, 2009, .
 Juja, Novel, Verbrecher-Verlag, 2010, .
 Mein sanfter Zwilling (My Gentle Twin), Novel, Frankfurter Verlagsanstalt, 2011, .
 Zorn (Anger), Screen Play, Verlag der Autoren, 2011, .
 Das achte Leben (Für Brilka) (The Eighth Life (For Brilka)), Novel, Frankfurter Verlagsanstalt, 2014, .
 Die Katze und der General (The Cat and the General), Novel, Frankfurter Verlagsanstalt, 2018, .
 The Eighth Life (For Brilka), translated by Charlotte Collins and Ruth Martin, Scribe, 2019, .
 L'ottava vita (per Brilka), Marsilio, Venice, 2020, .

References

External links
 Facebook page of Nino Haratischwili

1983 births
Living people
Dramatists and playwrights from Georgia (country)
Expatriates from Georgia (country) in Germany
21st-century German novelists
German women writers
Novelists from Georgia (country)
21st-century writers from Georgia (country)
21st-century women writers from Georgia (country)
21st-century dramatists and playwrights from Georgia (country)
21st-century German women
Writers from Tbilisi